The Papyrus Lansing is an ancient Egyptian document written during the reign of the pharaoh Senusret III. The scroll was written in the 18th century B.C. by Nebmare-nakht, the royal scribe and chief overseer of the cattle of Amun. It was directed to his pupil, Wenemdiamun, and advocated the benefits of becoming a scribe while simultaneously denouncing other jobs such as farming and soldiering for the physical labor and danger involved. The text was later used as practice for new scribes.

Context 
During Senusret III's reign, the political difficulties of the 10th, 11th, and 12th dynasties had been nearly resolved, leaving him free to campaign deep into Nubia, dig canals, and increase the power of his government. This increase in government created a need for more scribes, and the Papyrus Lansing served not only as a message encouraging Nebmare-nakht's apprentice Wenemdiamun to continue his journey to become a scribe, but also increased public interest as the document circulated, encouraging many others to become scribes as well. In addition, new scribes copied the Lansing Papyrus, in which role it served as both practice and propaganda. The papyrus was found in Thebes and acquired by the British Museum in 1886.

Content 
The Papyrus Lansing is divided into five parts: Praise of the Scribe's Profession; Advice to the Unwilling Pupil; All Occupations Are Bad Except That of the Scribe; The Misfortunes of the Peasant; and The Scribe Does Not Suffer Like the Soldier.

Praise of the Scribe's Profession 
The first section introduces the author as Nebmare-nakht, royal scribe and chief overseer of Amun-ra's sacred cattle. He then claims that becoming a scribe will lead to great advancement, and Wenemdiamun should shun all else in the pursuit of becoming a scribe. Finally, he claims that writing pleases "more than bread and beer".

Advice to the Unwilling Pupil 
The second section begins by chastising Wenemdiamun for his slowness to obey and mourning that no amount of whipping can seem to fix his laziness. Nebmare-nakht says that Wenemdiamun would make in excellent scribe if he put himself to his work. Then he again declares how enjoyable writing is, this time comparing it to the joy of a mother with her newborn.

All Occupations Are Bad Except That of the Scribe 
Nebmare-nakht begins by explaining that the occupation of the launderer is inferior because they have to burden their arms with carrying around heavy laundry and scrubbing clothing. The potter is inferior because they end up covered in clay, the cobbler "mingles with vats. His odor is penetrating. His hands are red with madder, like one who is smeared with blood." The watchman's job is inferior because they have to stay up all night. The merchants have to travel upstream and downstream all the time and are busy. Sailors don't expect to see Egypt again when they leave. If carpenters don't sell their wood, the shipwright will get after them, and the man who cuts the timber gets it worst of all because he has to stay out working all day.

The Misfortunes of the Peasant 
When it rains, the peasant is soaked. He farms all day and makes rope all night. If he leaves out his team of horses, they get eaten by jackals and he has to beg for money to get another one. When he finally has the money to proceed, his field needs to be plowed again and he has to use borrowed grain. Even then, there are snakes, and sometimes the crop doesn't grow. Nubians can steal grain, and if there's none to give, the farmer is beaten, tied, and thrown in a well. Then his wife and children are made into slaves, and there's still no grain.

The Scribe Does Not Suffer Like the Soldier 
Nebmare-nakht advises Wenemdiamun to make himself a trusted scribe because he can gain wealth and prestige if he does. Nebmare-nakht then states that a soldier is the lowest of the low in rank, has to wake at all hours, toils like a slave, and is hungry. He has no clothes and little water, and is taken quickly by disease or arrows. If he lives, he will be worn out from marching. The scribe has to worry about none of this.

See also 
 List of ancient Egyptian papyri

References

Bibliography

External links 
 World History Encyclopedia History article referenced from  The Ancient World: Readings in Social and Cultural History by D. Brendan Nagle, Stanley M. Burstein retrieved 20:30-3GMT 29.9.11

Egyptian papyri